Brooksby is a deserted village and former civil parish, now in the parish of Hoby with Rotherby, in the Melton district, in Leicestershire, England. It was the ancestral home of the Villiers family. Brooksby and surrounding villages were served by Brooksby railway station. In 1931 the parish had a population of 69.

The name 'Brooksby' means 'farm/settlement of Brok' or 'farm/settlement with a brook'.

On 1 April 1936 the parish was abolished to form Hoby with Rotherby.

Brooksby Hall, a 16th-century manor house, and the Church of St Michael and All Angels, Brooksby, are all that remains of a village that was cleared to enable sheep to be grazed. The church was once the living for Henry Gregg who was married to the writer Mary Kirby. Today the hall has conference and banqueting facilities. Brooksby Melton College offers apprenticeships and further education training courses in animal care, countryside, equine, fisheries, and land based service engineering.

References

External links
Brooksby Retrieved 26 August 2013
Brooksby Hall

Villages in Leicestershire
Deserted medieval villages in Leicestershire
Former civil parishes in Leicestershire
Borough of Melton